The following lists events that happened during 1967 in Singapore.

Incumbents
President: Yusof Ishak
Prime Minister: Lee Kuan Yew

Events

January
27 January – The Chartered Industries of Singapore is established to produce ammunition for the Singapore Armed Forces.

February
15 February – The Civilian War Memorial is unveiled at the War Memorial Park.
24 February – 1967 by-elections: Nomination day is held for the by-elections. After nominations closed, People's Action Party (PAP) candidates Teo Hup Teck (Jalan Kayu), Chew Chin Han (Tampines), Patma Salvadurai (Bukit Panjang) and Lim Soo Peng (Havelock) win their seats via a walkover. However, there is a contest for the Thomson seat, where PAP's Ang Nam Piau campaigned against two independent candidates, M. P. D. Nair and Chan Yoke Kwong.

March
7 March – The 1967 by-election is held in the Thomson constituency only. After polling closed, PAP's Ang Nam Piau won by a huge majority of 9,407 votes against M. P. D. Nair and Chan Yoke Kwong, who had garnered 1,310 and 537 votes respectively. The by-election resulted in the PAP having all the seats in Parliament until the 1981 Anson by-election, where J. B. Jeyaretnam from the Workers' Party wins the by-election.
14 March – The National Service bill is passed by the parliament.
18 March – Shin Min Daily News is launched.
28 March – Registrations for National Service begin at the Central Manpower Base.
30 March – The SEACOM cable is launched. The cable went in operation until its decommissioning in 1986.

April
7 April – The Board of Commissioners of Currency Singapore (present day Monetary Authority of Singapore) is established with the power to issue Singapore currency.

May
5 May – The Republic of Singapore Navy is formed.
11 May – The Garden City vision was introduced to make Singapore a clean and green city, with the planting of trees.

June
12 June – The first currency notes, known as the Orchid series were issued, as well as the Marine Series.

July
July – The first batch of the army is drafted for National Service.

August
8 August – Singapore is one of the founding members of the Association of Southeast Asian Nations (ASEAN).

October
30 October - The Science Council of Singapore is formed to develop Singapore's capabilities in science and technology.

Births
 1 July – Kym Ng, actress.
 6 October – Terence Cao, actor.
 30 October – Murali Pillai, politician.
 31 October – Mardan Mamat, golf player.
 21 November – Benedict Tan, former national sailor.
 Claire Tham – author.

Deaths
 2 June – Lee Kong Chian – Businessman, philanthropist (b. 1893).

References

 
Singapore
Years in Singapore